Morecambe Tramways served the town of Morecambe in Lancashire from 3 June 1887 until 24 October 1924.

History
The first section to open (1869) was from the Central Pier to the Battery Hotel. In 1888 the line was extended from the hotel to Strawberry Gardens in Heysham, and in 1895 an extension was built from the pier to East View. These lines were built and owned by The Morecambe Tramways Company Limited. Finally in 1897 an extension was built to Bare by Morecambe Corporation and leased to the Tramways company. In 1909 Morecambe Corporation purchased the section between Battery and Bare, leaving the Tramway Company to operate the 1.25 mile Battery to Strawberry Gardens section. This section was relaid and operated using petrol mechanical trams from 1912 to 24 October 1924.

Infrastructure

Tramcars
The fleet, in a livery of maroon, teak and white, and later green, consisted of:
 2 single deck tramcars
 15 double deck horse tramcars
 4 single deck petrol tramcars

See also
List of town tramway systems in the United Kingdom

References

External links
 Morecambe Tramways uniformed staff.
 Morecambe horse tram on Flickr
 Morecambe horse tram on Flickr
 Morecambe horse tram on Flickr
 Morecambe horse tram on Flickr

Tram transport in England
Companies based in Lancashire
Morecambe
Historic transport in Lancashire
Transport in the City of Lancaster
Railway companies established in 1869
Railway companies disestablished in 1924